Fairdale is a rural locality in the South Burnett Region, Queensland, Australia. In the  Fairdale had a population of 35 people.

History 
Mondure Central State School opened on 26 September 1910 but on 13 October 1932 was renamed Fairdale State School. It closed in 1972. It was located to the west of the junction of Fairdale Road (also known as Mondure Cushnie Road) and Springs Road.

In the  Fairdale had a population of 35 people.

References 

South Burnett Region
Localities in Queensland